Frank Joseph Marion (July 25, 1869 – March 28, 1963) was an American motion picture pioneer.  He was born in Tidioute, Pennsylvania. He had a wife named Florence and 4 daughters and a son.  He was married to Florence until her death.

Career 
At the turn of the 20th century when the film industry was still in its infancy, Frank Marion was employed at Biograph Studios in New York City as a sales manager as well as a screenwriter in collaboration with head writer Wallace McCutcheon. In 1907, Marion along with Biograph production manager Samuel Long, left the company to form their own film production business. Needing capital, they obtained financial backing from wealthy Chicago businessman and film distributor, George Kleine. Using their last name initials KLM, they called their new venture the Kalem Company.

Immediately successful, Marion proved to be an innovator and a businessman with a social conscience when he raised actor's wages to five dollars a day, thereby forcing the rest of the industry to follow suit. The Kalem company achieved a first in the film industry when, upon the urging of Gene Gauntier, who had brought the company success with the Girl Spy serial films she had starred in, Marion sent Gauntier, director Sidney Olcott and a crew to Ireland in 1910 to make A Lad From Old Ireland, the first ever U.S. motion picture to be shot on location outside of the United States.

Two years later, Marion sent Olcott's crew to Palestine where they filmed From the Manger to the Cross (1912). In 1998, this film was selected for the National Film Registry of the United States Library of Congress.  In November 1917, given his experience in the film industry, Marion was appointed to be the director of the offices the Committee on Public Information created in Spain and Italy.

After ten years in business, the Kalem Company was sold to Vitagraph Studios and Frank Marion became part of Vitagraph management.

Selected filmography
The Country Doctor (1927)

Death 
Frank Marion died in 1963 in Stamford, Connecticut.

References

External links 

 Frank J. Marion website dedicated to Sidney Olcott

1870 births
1963 deaths
American film studio executives
American film production company founders
Cinema pioneers
Syracuse University alumni